Corpse for Sale (Italian: Un morto da vendere) is a one-act play by Dario Fo.

Plot summary
A pair of Card Sharps shoot a simpleton after they are beaten by him in a card game.

Translations
Ed Emery has carried out an authorized English translation.

References

Plays by Dario Fo
1958 plays